Sammy Kahsai (born March 5, 1995) is an Ethiopian footballer who plays as a midfielder.

Career

College and amateur
Kahsai played four years of college soccer, playing his first season at Washington Adventist University in 2014 before transferring to the University of Maryland, Baltimore County.

Kahsai also played with Premier Development League side Albuquerque Sol in 2017.

Professional
Kahsai signed his first professional deal with USL Championship club Pittsburgh Riverhounds SC on March 4, 2019.

References

1995 births
Living people
Ethiopian footballers
Association football midfielders
UMBC Retrievers men's soccer players
Albuquerque Sol FC players
Pittsburgh Riverhounds SC players
Maryland Bobcats FC players
Soccer players from Maryland
USL Championship players
USL League Two players
National Independent Soccer Association players